Zyginidia is a genus of true bugs belonging to the family Cicadellidae.

The species of this genus are found in Europe.

Species:
 Zyginidia adamczewskii Dworakowska, 1970 
 Zyginidia alexandrina (Linnavuori, 1964)

References

Cicadellidae
Hemiptera genera